George Whitefield College  (abbrev GWC) is a Christian theological college in Muizenberg, Cape Town, South Africa.

History 
The college is named after the 18th-century English evangelist George Whitefield.

The inception of the George Whitfield College was in the early-1970s when candidates for the Reformed Evangelical Anglican Church of South Africa ministry were trained at the Bible Institute of South Africa in Kalk Bay. Bishop Bradley and other members of the Church were aware that the candidates were not receiving adequate training and knowledge of the doctrines, practices and history of the Church of England. It was agreed that this was necessary so once a week, these candidates met in the library at the Institute for tuition on the Book of Common Prayer and other issues central to the CESA worship. The Rev Shucksmith from the Pinelands, Cape Town congregation took these lectures until his return to the UK. In 1976, Rev Streeter joined the lecturing staff of the Bible Institute from Fort Victoria in what was then Rhodesia. 

As time passed, the Bible Institute became concerned that it may be perceived as being closely aligned to one denomination so it became apparent that change was necessary. George Whitefield College was founded in 1989 on the initiative of Bishop Joe Bell, then presiding bishop of the Church of England in South Africa, and its founding Principal was David Broughton Knox, who had been principal of Moore Theological College for 27 years.

In 1997 GWC became affiliated with Potchefstroom University for Christian Higher Education, now known as North-West University, and with Dr Seccombe an accredited external New Testament professor of NWU. Up until 2010, most students of GWC were also students of NWU, and although they studied at GWC with GWC’s curriculum, they were able to graduate with the Bachelor of Theology, the Bachelor of Arts Honours, and the Master of Arts from NWU. Since January 2010, GWC has offered its own BTh program, one that has been fully accredited by the Council for Higher Education.

Visiting scholars spend time at GWC and conduct PostGraduate modules: In 2011, Dr Paul Bowers (New Testament), in 2012 Dr Abel Ndjerareou (Old Testament), Dr George Athas (Hebrew), Dr Peter Bolt (New Testament) and as special guest in Feb 2013 Dr Mark Thompson, principal elect of Moore Theological College. GWC has also employed new PhDs in a postdoc capacity resulting in the publishing of several books: Dr Vhumani Magezi on Pastoral counselling and Aids in Southern Africa (2011), and Dr Fabulous Moyo in the area of Church history in Malawi (2012).

GWC hosts an annual lecture which in October 2009 was given by former member of faculty Dr James Krohn on the topic of Calvin as preacher of the Word. In October 2010 Dr John Azumah delivered this lecture. In 2012 this lecture was given by Dr Ashley Null.

GWC seeks to maintain ties with the Bible Institute of South Africa situated in Kalk Bay in Cape Town, and two sister CESA colleges: the Johannesburg Bible College and the Kwazulu-Natal Missionary and Bible College (KMBC) formerly Trinity Academy. The college also maintains close ties with several local churches including St James Church Kenilworth whose rector is former GWC vice principal Dr Mervyn Eloff.

George Whitefield College is overseen by a board of directors chaired by Bishop Frank Retief up till September 2010, but recently succeeded by Bishop Desmond Inglesby currently the presiding bishop of the Church of England in South Africa. The board is fully compliant with demands set by the King James Version.

Programs 
GWC is registered with the South African Department of Higher Education and Training and is accredited by the Council on Higher Education to offer a series of certificate courses and degrees.

Higher Certificate in Theology (HCertTheol) (1 year full-time) This Higher Certificate in Theology is registered under the South African Qualifications Authority ID 98789, NQF Level 5. The certificate offers the option of two tracks: The General Track and The Children’s Ministry Track.

Bachelor of Theology Degree (BTh) (3 years full-time) This Bachelor of Theology degree is registered under the South African Qualifications Authority ID 61870, NQF Level 5-7. 

Bachelor of Theology Honours (BThHons) (1 year full-time) GWC’s Bachelor of Theology Honours degree is registered under the South African Qualifications Authority ID 97821, NQF Level 8.

Master of Theology Degree (MTh) (2 years full-time) GWC’s Master of Theology degree is registered under the South African Qualifications Authority ID 101609, NQF Level 9.

The college offers a selection of programmes in theology, with the core subjects being Doctrine, Biblical Languages, Church History and Biblical Theology.

Evangelical Research Fellowship (abbrev ERF) The aim of the ERF is to provide a stimulating academic environment in the Reformed tradition for students who are enrolled in PhD studies at other universities, as well as for students who are enrolled in GWC’s Bachelor of Theology Honours and Masters programmes.

Explore Correspondence Course The Explore Correspondence Course, also known as “Explore”, is an internally managed programme which, at any given time, has in the region of 100 enrolments in about 10 countries, including Madagascar and Thailand. Explore comprises an 8-module distance learning programme, designed so that each module can be systematically completed over three months, with the option to write an examination at the end of each module. A certificate of completion is provided to each student who completes the course.

Academic Resources 
All courses at the college have lists of required and recommended reading, making the college library a vital resource in the lives of every student. As such, The Broughton Knox Study Centre houses an extensive collection of titles covering theology, biblical studies, history, philosophy, missiology and more. It presently holds more than 60,000 books and a plan is currently being implemented to bring it to PhD standard. Postgraduate students registered for the Evangelical Research Fellowship have access to online resources that they are able to subscribe to, such as ATLA and JSTOR.

E-learning is increasingly a feature of the GWC learning culture. Students can access much of the recommended reading via the library intranet and the college’s e-learning platform, affectionately known as Phoebe. The college provides a Wi-Fi network all students across the campus and student residences. A computer lab is located in the Study Centre, so that no student is without computer access.

Great effort has gone into collecting original sources and tools for studying the Christian Faith. Beyond its usefulness for undergraduate study and postgraduate research, the library is a precious depository of Christian culture.

Enrollment 
Since it was founded in 1989, the college has enrolled students from Namibia, Angola, Zambia, Zimbabwe, Mozambique, Malawi, Tanzania, Rwanda, Burundi, Cameroon, Uganda, Kenya, Congo, the Gambia, Nigeria, Sudan, Ethiopia, UK, Germany, Canada, Chile, Norway, USA, Ireland, Bermuda and Australia.

References

External links 
 Official Site

Seminaries and theological colleges in South Africa
Christian organizations established in 1989
Educational institutions established in 1989
Anglican organizations established in the 20th century
1989 establishments in South Africa
Reformed Evangelical Anglican Church of South Africa